USL1 Spokane is a planned American professional soccer team based in Spokane, Washington. First announced in 2021, the team plans to play in USL League One beginning in 2024.

History

In March 2021, United Soccer League announced a proposal to build a 5,000-seat stadium in downtown Spokane to serve as home to a new USL League One club. In May 2021, the Spokane Public School Board voted to approve the $31 million stadium project. In June 2021, Spokane was named as one of the founding cities of the USL W League, a women's league set to begin play in 2022.

In December 2021, the Spokane Public Facilities District met with USL and MLS Next Pro officials over which league would place a team at the city-run stadium.

On October 7, 2022, the team announced that their men's team would start play in USL League One in 2024. The new ownership group, Aequus Sports, LLC (led by Ryan and Katie Harnetiaux), was also announced.

References

External links
 

Soccer clubs in Washington (state)
Association football clubs established in 2021
2021 establishments in Washington (state)
USL League One teams
Sports in Spokane, Washington